Fritz Janschka (1919 – April 30, 2016) was an Austrian artist and founding member of the Viennese painting school of Fantastic Realism. His work is included in the Museum of Fantastic Realism in Vienna.

Janschka moved to the United States in 1949.

References

2016 deaths
1919 births
20th-century American painters
American male painters
20th-century American male artists
20th-century Austrian painters
Austrian male painters